Ninoslav Tmušić (born July 18, 1973) is a former Serbian professional basketball player who last played for Karpoš Sokoli.

References

External links
 Eurobasket Profile
 BGBasket Profile
 Yambolbasket Profile

1973 births
Living people
Basketball League of Serbia players
Centers (basketball)
KK Igokea players
KK Jagodina players
KK Kolubara players
KK Novi Sad players
KK Prokuplje players
BC Yambol players
People from Prijepolje
Serbian men's basketball players
Serbian expatriate basketball people in Bosnia and Herzegovina
Serbian expatriate basketball people in Bulgaria
Serbian expatriate basketball people in North Macedonia
Serbian expatriate basketball people in Montenegro